Billy Eichner (born September 18, 1978) is an American comedian, actor, producer, and screenwriter. He is the star, executive producer, and creator of Funny Or Die's Billy on the Street, a comedy game show that aired on truTV. The show earned Eichner a nomination for the Daytime Emmy Award for Outstanding Game Show Host in 2013. He is also known for playing Craig Middlebrooks on the sitcom Parks and Recreation, Mr. Ambrose the Librarian on the animated TV series Bob's Burgers, and Timon in the 2019 remake of The Lion King.

Early life and education
Eichner is a native of Queens and grew up in Forest Hills, the son of Debbie, who worked for a phone company, and Jay Eichner, a rent tax auditor. He was born to a Jewish family and had a Madonna-themed bar mitzvah. He has an older half-brother. He graduated from Stuyvesant High School in 1996, and from Northwestern University in 2000 with a BS in Theater. Actor Robin Lord Taylor was his college roommate.

Career
Eichner gained attention as the host and writer of Creation Nation: A Live Talk Show, a critically acclaimed stage show in New York. He landed a Bravo web series called My Life on the Z-List: Jen's Vlog and was a co-host on the Bravo television pilot Joan Rivers' Straight Talk, where Rivers discussed topics with four gay men. He appeared on Conan as a special correspondent in original video shorts.

In 2011, Eichner starred in the show Billy on the Street. The show initially aired on Fuse, before moving to truTV. It was created within Funny or Die, and is now available on HBO Max and the TruTV app. It had a final run of short-form episodes across digital platforms in association with Lyft. In it, Eichner goes around the streets of New York City, asking people random questions or having them compete in trivia games. He often has celebrities who compete in games or go around the streets with him.

On August 5, 2013, Eichner guest starred in the sixth season of Parks and Recreation. Eichner's first episode aired on October 10, 2013. He stars as Donna's Eagleton counterpart, Craig Middlebrooks, who joins the Pawnee Parks and Recreation Department when Pawnee absorbs Eagleton. He became a series regular in episode four of the seventh season of the show.

During the 66th Primetime Emmy Awards show in 2014, Eichner appeared with host Seth Meyers on the streets of New York, interviewing random people.

Eichner starred in the Hulu original series Difficult People, with Julie Klausner. It was executive produced by Amy Poehler. Though originally set up for USA Network, the series began airing on Hulu in August 2015.

In 2016, Eichner appeared in Neighbors 2: Sorority Rising, released May 20. In 2017, he joined the cast of American Horror Story for recurring roles in its seventh and eighth seasons.

In 2019, Eichner provided the voice of Timon in Disney's live action remake of The Lion King, from director Jon Favreau. Eichner said that Timon "[is] such a great role that allows you to do so much. But... the bigger the project and the bigger the names that you're working with, the more you have to ignore it. If you get to the soundstage and you're thinking, 'Oh my God, what a full-circle moment! Nathan Lane did it originally! Beyoncé's in this!' then you're paralyzed creatively. You just have to put that out of your head in order to get the job done."

In July 2020, Eichner announced that he and Tom McNulty were developing a film biography of fellow Northwestern University alum Paul Lynde called Man in the Box, with Eichner portraying Lynde.

In March 2021, Eichner announced that he was writing and starring in the film Bros, which tells the story of two gay men with commitment issues who decide to settle down with each other. In August, Amazon Studios announced that they had bought the rights to develop the film Ex-Husbands, starring Eichner and co-written by him and Paul Rudnick. Bros was critically well-received but a box-office disappointment, which Eichner attributed to "straight people, especially in certain parts of the country" not going to see the film.

Personal life
Eichner is Jewish  and gay. He lives in Los Angeles.

Politics
Eichner is a Democrat. On February 1, 2018, Eichner announced a new initiative called Glam Up the Midterms, during that night's episode of Jimmy Kimmel Live!, in conjunction with Funny or Die and with the support of several late night hosts including Sarah Silverman, James Corden, Seth Meyers, Jimmy Kimmel, Conan O'Brien, John Oliver, Chelsea Handler, Robin Thede, and Andy Cohen. Glam Up the Midterm's purpose was getting people to vote in the November 6 midterms, especially millennials, of whom only 12% voted in the previous midterm election. Eichner joined the progressive political organization Swing Left as senior advisor starting in 2019 and endorsed Elizabeth Warren in the 2020 Democratic Party presidential primaries.

Filmography

Film

Television

Web

Awards and nominations

See also
 LGBT culture in New York City
 List of LGBT people from New York City

References

Further reading

External links

 
 
 Profile at Funny or Die ; accessed January 3, 2015.

1978 births
Living people
20th-century American comedians
20th-century American male actors
21st-century American comedians
21st-century American male actors
21st-century American male writers
American game show hosts
American LGBT screenwriters
American gay actors
American gay writers
American male comedians
American male comedy actors
American male screenwriters
American male television actors
American male voice actors
Comedians from California
Comedians from Illinois
Comedians from New York City
LGBT television producers
Jewish American male actors
Jewish American male comedians
Jewish American screenwriters
Gay comedians
Gay Jews
LGBT people from New York (state)
Gay screenwriters
Male actors from Evanston, Illinois
Male actors from Los Angeles
Male actors from New York City
New York (state) Democrats
Northwestern University School of Communication alumni
Screenwriters from California
Screenwriters from Illinois
Screenwriters from New York (state)
Stuyvesant High School alumni
Television producers from California
Television producers from Illinois
Television producers from Queens, New York
Writers from Queens, New York
21st-century American Jews
21st-century American LGBT people
American LGBT comedians